JWM Partners LLC was a hedge fund started by John Meriwether after the collapse of Long-Term Capital Management (LTCM) in 1998. LTCM was one of the most spectacular failures of Wall Street, leading to a bailout of around $4 billion that was provided by a consortium of Wall Street banks. Meriwether started the company with initial capital of $250 million with loyal quants and traders like Victor Haghani, Larry Hilibrand, Dick Leahy, Arjun Krishnamachar and Eric Rosenfeld. As of April 2008, the company had around $1.6 billion in management.  Eric Rosenfeld left to start his own fund.

Performance
The funds posted gains for several years, but in the first quarter of 2008 posted losses, of 14% in the Global Macro Fund, and 31% in the flagship Relative Value Opportunity bond fund. Together with redemptions, this cut the capital base significantly.

Mission
The fund claimed to use the same model as LTCM with more rigorous and better risk management. It also claimed a leverage ratio of 15 to 1.

Closure
On July 7, 2009, it was announced that the fund would be closed after suffering a loss of 44% in the main fund between September 2007 and February 2009.

References

Notes
 
 

Financial services companies established in 1998
Hedge fund firms in Connecticut
Companies based in Greenwich, Connecticut